Parker Dam is an unincorporated community in San Bernardino County, California, United States. It is named after Parker Dam, which impounds the  Colorado River nearby. Parker Dam has a post office with ZIP code 92267. The post office opened in 1935 and closed briefly between 1939 and 1940.

References

Unincorporated communities in San Bernardino County, California
Unincorporated communities in California